Andreychuk (or in Cyrillic, Андрійчук) is a Ukrainian surname meaning Andrew's son, and may refer to:

 Dave Andreychuk (born 1963), Canadian professional ice hockey player
 Raynell Andreychuk (born 1944), Canadian Senator

See also
 
 Andriychuk
 Dave Andreychuk Mountain Arena & Skating Centre, Hamilton, Ontario

Ukrainian-language surnames
Patronymic surnames